DFSM may refer to:
 Defence Force Service Medal
 Deterministic finite state machine
 Dry-film photoimageable solder mask, a type of solder mask on printed circuit boards
 Irish Defence Forces School of Music